Fajans is a surname. Notable people with the name include:

Kazimierz Fajans (1887–1975), Polish American physical chemist
Maksymilian Fajans (1827–1890), Polish-Jewish artist, lithographer and photographer

See also
Fajans–Paneth–Hahn Law
Fajans' rules
Radioactive displacement law of Fajans and Soddy